Enter the Anime is a 2019 American–Japanese documentary film. It features Tania Nolan trying to explain the popularity of anime by interviewing Shinji Aramaki, Kôzô Morishita and Yoko Takahashi, the creators behind well-known productions like Castlevania, Aggretsuko and Kengan Ashura. The documentary was released by Netflix on August 5, 2019.

Plot
Tania Nolan interviews anime creators, despite saying at the beginning of the film that she does not know anything about anime. Nolan's goal is to teach herself what anime is and how Japanese culture can produce such animation. The film depicts interviews with people who worked on anime series that were licensed by Netflix. The first person Nolan interviews is Adi Shankar, who was the executive producer of the anime-inspired Castlevania series. All of the interviewees have worked on Netflix licensed series, but no anime that is not licensed by Netflix is mentioned. An early article by Geek.com stated that the documentary would help people who are new to anime learn about it, although reviews published after the film's release disagreed with this assessment.

Release
Enter the Anime was released on August 5, 2019 on Netflix streaming.

Reception
Brian Costello of Common Sense Media wrote, "Any potentially interesting discussion on the history of anime, Japanese culture, and the creative processes of anime's greatest artists is short-circuited by the obnoxious presentation and bombastic overproduction". John Serba, writing for Decider, stated, "Enter the Anime is such thinly disguised promotional content, it's like throwing a twin-sized bedsheet over a nuclear missile and insisting it's just a firecracker". A review by John Maher of Thrillist says, "Anything that has the potential to bring in new fans to the medium is a positive, even an effort this misbegotten. But Enter the Anime is a documentary that fails every audience, refusing to explain anything fans don't know and offering no context for curious outsiders".

References

External links

 
 

2019 documentary films
2019 films
2010s Japanese-language films
Netflix original documentary films